Walter Harper North (November 1, 1871 – July 23, 1952) was an American jurist.

Born in Hillsdale County, Michigan, North received his bachelor's degree from University of Michigan Law School in 1899. North practiced law in Battle Creek, Michigan until 1906 when he was appointed Calhoun County, Michigan circuit court judge. North was a Republican. From 1927 until his death in 1952, North served on the Michigan Supreme Court and was chief justice. North died at University Hospital in Ann Arbor, Michigan.

Notes

1871 births
1952 deaths
People from Battle Creek, Michigan
People from Hillsdale County, Michigan
University of Michigan Law School alumni
Michigan Republicans
Michigan lawyers
Michigan state court judges
Chief Justices of the Michigan Supreme Court
Justices of the Michigan Supreme Court